Pork is a food taboo among Jews, Muslims, some Orthodox Christians and some Christian denominations. Swine were prohibited in ancient Syria and Phoenicia, and the pig and its flesh represented a taboo observed, Strabo noted, at Comana in Pontus. A lost poem of Hermesianax, reported centuries later by the traveller Pausanias, reported an etiological myth of Attis destroyed by a supernatural boar to account for the fact that "in consequence of these events the Galatians who inhabit Pessinous do not touch pork".  In Abrahamic religions, eating pig flesh is clearly forbidden by Jewish (kashrut), Islamic (haram) and Adventist (kosher animals) dietary laws.

Although Christianity is also an Abrahamic religion, most of its adherents do not follow these aspects of Mosaic law and are permitted to consume pork. However, Seventh-day Adventists consider pork taboo, along with other foods forbidden by Jewish law. The Ethiopian Orthodox Church and the Eritrean Orthodox Church do not permit pork consumption. Hebrew Roots Movement adherents also do not consume pork.

Prohibition in Jewish law
The Torah (Pentateuch) contains passages in Leviticus that lists the animals people are permitted to eat. According to Leviticus 11:3, animals like cows, sheep, and deer that have divided hooves and chew their cud may be consumed. Pigs should not be eaten because they don't chew their cud. The ban on the consumption of pork is repeated in Deuteronomy 14:8.

During the Roman period, Jewish abstinence from pork consumption became one of the most identifiable features of Jewish religion to outsiders of the faith. One example appears in Tacitus' Histories 5.4.1-2. Because Jewish dietary restrictions on pork were well-known to non-Jews, foreign attempts of oppression and assimilation of Jewish populations into Hellenistic and Roman custom often involved attempting to force Jewish populations into consuming pork. According to 2 Maccabees 6:18-7:48, the Seleucid emperor Antiochus IV Epiphanes attempted to force Jews in his realm to consuming pork as a part of his attempted restrictions on the practice of Judaism. In addition, Philo of Alexandria records that during the Alexandrian riots (38) against Jewish communities in the city of Alexandria, some Alexandrian mobs also attempted to force Jews into consuming pork. Some forms of Jewish Christianity also adopted these restrictions on the consumption of pork, as is noted in the Didascalia Apostolorum.

Prohibition in Islamic law
One example of verses from the Quran on pig consumption:

There are different schools of thought in Islam that offer different opinions on eating meat other than pork, which is unanimously forbidden. Generally, so long as it was affirmed that no impurities came in contact with the meat served in western countries (which are mostly governed by the People of the Book), then it is considered Halal. However, the Islamic Cultural Centre Ireland considers meat slaughtered by non-Muslims to be forbidden. Another school of thought such as the Hanafi Maddhab require that the meat be certified as Halal only by ensuring Islamic slaughtering of the animals. Most South Asian Muslims follow that.

According to Sozomen, some Arabs in pre-Islamic Arabia who traced their ancestry to Ishmael abstained from the consumption of pork.

Other
According to Herodotus, the Scythians had a taboo against the pig, which was never offered in sacrifice, and apparently the Scythians loathed so much as to even keep swine within their lands.

Scottish pork taboo was Donald Alexander Mackenzie's phrase for discussing an aversion to pork among Scots, particularly Highlanders, which he believed stemmed from an ancient taboo. Several writers who confirm that there was a prejudice against pork, or a superstitious attitude toward pigs, do not see it in terms of a taboo related to an ancient cult. Any prejudice is generally agreed to have disappeared by 1800.

Interpretations of restrictions

The cultural materialistic anthropologist Marvin Harris thinks that the main reason for prohibiting consumption of pork was ecological-economical. Pigs require water and shady woods with seeds, but those conditions are scarce in the Middle East. Unlike many other forms of livestock, pigs are omnivorous scavengers, eating virtually anything they come across, including carrion and refuse, which was deemed unclean. Furthermore, a Middle Eastern society keeping large stocks of pigs could destroy their ecosystem.

It is speculated that chickens supplanted pigs as a more portable and efficient source of meat, and these practical concerns led to the religious restrictions.

Maimonides, the Jewish philosopher, legal codifier, and court physician to the Muslim sultan Saladin in the 12th century, understood the dietary laws chiefly as a means of keeping the body healthy. He argued that the meat of the forbidden animals, birds, and fish is unwholesome and indigestible. According to Maimonides, at first glance, this does not apply to pork, which does not appear to be harmful. Yet, Maimonides observes, the pig is a filthy animal, and if swine were used for food, marketplaces and even houses would be dirtier than latrines.

Rashi (the primary Jewish commentator on the Bible and Talmud) lists the prohibition of pig as a law whose reason is not known, and may therefore be derided by others as making no sense.

The Sefer HaChinuch (an early work of Halachah) gives a general overview of the Jewish dietary laws. He writes "And if there are any reasons for the dietary laws which are unknown to us or those knowledgeable in the health field, do not wonder about them, for the true Healer that warns us against them is smarter than us, and smarter than the doctors."

See also

 Food and drink prohibitions
 Islamic dietary laws
 Jewish dietary laws
 Kosher
 Kosher foods
 Pigbel
 Pig toilet
 Trichinosis
 Vegetarianism and religion – has a more complete list
 Unclean animal

References

External links
 Verse 174 of Chapter 2 (Al-Baqarah) in the Quran prohibiting "the blood and flesh of swine"
 Laws of Judaism and Islam concerning food

 Darshan, Guy, “Pork Consumption as an Identity Marker in Ancient Israel: The Textual Evidence,” Journal for the Study of Judaism 53,4-5 (2022).

Pork
Taboo